Liam Duggan (born 11 December 1996) is a professional Australian rules footballer who plays for the West Coast Eagles in the Australian Football League (AFL).

Duggan played for Ballarat's St Patrick's College in the Herald Sun Shield, the Western Jets at TAC Cup and Vic Metro in the National U18s. In 2014 the AIS-AFL Academy awarded him with the Ben Mitchell Medal. Duggan was drafted with pick 11 of the 2014 National Draft.

He made his debut against  in round 2 of the 2015 season. Duggan had a standout game in the 53 point victory over St Kilda Football Club in round 8, 2015. He racked up 23 disposals including six marks and four tackles, which impressed his older teammates, notably Luke Shuey. Duggan suffered a season ending knee injury during a round 17 Western Australian Football League game playing for East Perth Football Club after copping a knock to his posterior cruciate ligament in his right knee. He finished his debut season with 12 senior games of AFL.

Statistics
Statistics are correct to the end of round 7, 2019

|- style="background-color: #EAEAEA"
! scope="row" style="text-align:center" | 2015
|style="text-align:center;"|
| 14 || 12 || 1 || 4 || 82 || 60 || 142 || 37 || 19 || 0.1 || 0.3 || 6.8 || 5.0 || 11.8 || 3.1 || 1.6
|-
! scope="row" style="text-align:center" | 2016
|style="text-align:center;"|
| 14 || 14 || 2 || 7 || 105 || 70 || 175 || 34 || 46 || 0.1 || 0.5 || 7.5 || 5.0 || 12.5 || 2.4 || 3.3
|- style="background:#eaeaea;"
! scope="row" style="text-align:center" | 2017
|style="text-align:center;"|
| 14 || 20 || 4 || 3 || 191 || 142 || 333 || 86 || 48 || 0.2 || 0.2 || 9.6 || 7.1 || 16.7 || 4.3 || 2.4
|-
|style="text-align:center;background:#afe6ba;"|2018†
|style="text-align:center;"|
| 14 || 24 || 2 || 2 || 291 || 116 || 407 || 115 || 49 || 0.1 || 0.1 || 12.1 || 4.8 || 17.0 || 4.8 || 2.0
|- style="background:#eaeaea;"
! scope="row" style="text-align:center" | 2019
|style="text-align:center;"|
| 14 || 6 || 0 || 0 || 73 || 28 || 101 || 33 || 11 || 0.0 || 0.0 || 12.2 || 4.7 || 16.8 || 5.5 || 1.8
|- class="sortbottom"
! colspan=3| Career
! 76 !! 9 !! 16 !! 742 !! 416 !! 1158 !! 305 !! 173 !! 0.1 !! 0.2 !! 9.8 !! 5.5 !! 15.2 !! 4.0 !! 2.3
|}

References

External links

1996 births
Living people
West Coast Eagles players
West Coast Eagles Premiership players
Australian rules footballers from Victoria (Australia)
Western Jets players
East Perth Football Club players
People educated at St Patrick's College, Ballarat
West Coast Eagles (WAFL) players
One-time VFL/AFL Premiership players